Bruce Rogers may refer to:
Bruce Rogers (typographer) (1870–1957), American typographer
Bruce Rogers (broadcaster), Canadian broadcaster
Bruce Rogers (swimmer) (born 1957), Canadian swimmer
Bruce Holland Rogers (born 1958), American writer